Javier Calvo Guirao (born 21 January 1991) is a Spanish actor, stage, film and television director and writer. He is best known for his role of Fernando "Fer" Redondo in the Antena 3 series Física o Química, and for creating and directing the musical La llamada and its film adaptation together with Javier Ambrossi, as well as the television series Paquita Salas and Veneno.

Career 
Calvo began acting in theatre at age 11, eventually appearing in 2007 in film Doctor Infierno. Beginning in 2008, he starred in the Antena 3 television series Física o Química, portraying gay teenager Fernando "Fer" Redondo. Focusing on problems such as drugs, addictions, anorexia and sexual orientation, the series attracted much controversy. Calvo considers the themes of the series "problems that are also present in reality". He, however, received critical acclaim for portraying a gay male in his debut role.

On 5 May 2012 a fan-conference with Calvo took place in Moscow, Russia.

Since 2013, Calvo co-directs La llamada at the Teatro Lara in Madrid, a musical he created alongside Javier Ambrossi.

In 2014, he made supporting role appearances in the Spanish soap opera Amar es para siempre and the Spanish television series Los misterios de Laura.

In August 2015, the Mexican production of La llamada opened at the López Tarso theatre in Mexico City, with a Mexican cast.

In July 2016 the web television series Paquita Salas, created by Calvo and Ambrossi, premiered on Flooxer. Due to the success of the series, Netflix acquired the rights to air the second season of the series.

In September 2017, the film adaptation of La llamada, directed by Calvo and Ambrossi, premiered in Spain.

Along with Ambrossi, Calvo was listed 47th in El Mundo's list of most important LGBT people in Spain in 2017.

From October 2017 to January 2018, Calvo and Ambrossi appeared on reality television talent competition Operación Triunfo as the teachers of acting in the "Academy".

In 2020, the Calvo and Ambrossi-created biographical television limited series Veneno aired on Atresplayer Premium and HBO Max.

Since 2020, Calvo is a panelist for Mask Singer: Adivina quién canta, the Spanish version of the international music game show Masked Singer. On 1 March 2021, Calvo was announced as a judge for Drag Race España, the Spanish version of the television drag queen competition Drag Race.

Personal life 

Calvo is fluent in English.

Calvo is openly gay. Since 2010, Calvo has been in a relationship with actor and director Javier Ambrossi.

Filmography

References

External links 
 
 Javier Calvo at the Internet Movie Database 

1991 births
Living people
Male actors from Madrid
Spanish male child actors
Spanish male film actors
Spanish male stage actors
Spanish male television actors
Spanish gay actors
Spanish LGBT actors
LGBT film directors
LGBT television directors
LGBT theatre directors
21st-century Spanish male actors
Drag Race España
21st-century Spanish LGBT people
Spanish film directors
Spanish television directors
Spanish theatre directors
21st-century Spanish screenwriters